The canton of Saint-Étienne-du-Valdonnez is an administrative division of the Lozère department, southern France. It was created at the French canton reorganisation which came into effect in March 2015. Its seat is in Saint-Étienne-du-Valdonnez.

It consists of the following communes:

Altier
La Bastide-Puylaurent
Bédouès-Cocurès
Les Bondons
Brenoux
Cubières
Cubiérettes
Lanuéjols
Mont Lozère et Goulet
Pied-de-Borne
Pont-de-Montvert-Sud-Mont-Lozère
Pourcharesses
Prévenchères
Saint-André-Capcèze
Saint-Bauzile
Saint-Étienne-du-Valdonnez
Vialas
Villefort

References

Cantons of Lozère